In combinatorial mathematics, the rencontres numbers are a triangular array of integers that enumerate permutations of the set { 1, ..., n } with specified numbers of fixed points: in other words, partial derangements.  (Rencontre is French for encounter.  By some accounts, the problem is named after a solitaire game.)  For n ≥ 0 and 0 ≤ k ≤ n, the rencontres number Dn, k is the number of permutations of { 1, ..., n } that have exactly k fixed points.

For example, if seven presents are given to seven different people, but only two are destined to get the right present, there are D7, 2 = 924 ways this could happen. Another often cited example is that of a dance school with 7 couples, where, after tea-break the participants are told to randomly find a partner to continue, then once more there are D7, 2 = 924 possibilities that 2 previous couples meet again by chance.

Numerical values 

Here is the beginning of this array :

Formulas 

The numbers in the k = 0 column enumerate derangements.  Thus
 

for non-negative n. It turns out that

where the ratio is rounded up for even n and rounded down for odd n. For n ≥ 1, this gives the nearest integer. 

More generally, for any , we have

The proof is easy after one knows how to enumerate derangements: choose the k fixed points out of n; then choose the derangement of the other n − k points.

The numbers  are generated by the power series ; accordingly,
an explicit formula for Dn, m can be derived as follows:

This immediately implies that

for n large, m fixed.

Probability distribution

The sum of the entries in each row for the table in "Numerical Values" is the total number of permutations of { 1, ..., n }, and is therefore n!.  If one divides all the entries in the nth row by n!, one gets the probability distribution of the number of fixed points of a uniformly distributed random permutation of { 1, ..., n }.  The probability that the number of fixed points is k is

For n ≥ 1, the expected number of fixed points is 1 (a fact that follows from linearity of expectation).

More generally, for i ≤ n, the ith moment of this probability distribution is the ith moment of the Poisson distribution with expected value 1.  For i > n, the ith moment is smaller than that of that Poisson distribution.  Specifically, for i ≤ n, the ith moment is the ith Bell number, i.e. the number of partitions of a set of size i.

Limiting probability distribution

As the size of the permuted set grows, we get

This is just the probability that a Poisson-distributed random variable with expected value 1 is equal to k.  In other words, as n grows, the probability distribution of the number of fixed points of a random permutation of a set of size n approaches the Poisson distribution with expected value 1.

See also
Oberwolfach problem, a different mathematical problem involving the arrangement of diners at tables
Problème des ménages, a similar problem involving partial derangements

References

 Riordan, John, An Introduction to Combinatorial Analysis, New York, Wiley, 1958, pages 57, 58, and 65.
 

Permutations
Discrete distributions
Fixed points (mathematics)
Triangles of numbers
Theory of probability distributions